Sej or SEJ may refer to:
 Sene language, a possibly extinct Papuan language
 Social Europe Journal
 Society of Environmental Journalists
 Scottish Educational Journal